Wesley Dale Buller (October 6, 1928 – April 2, 2018) was an American football coach.  He served as the head football coach at Bethel College in Newton, Kansas (1960–1964), Friends University in Wichita, Kansas (1965–1968), and Southwestern College in Winfield, Kansas (1969–1971), compiling a career college football record of 51–51–5.

Coaching career

Bethel
Buller was the head football coach at Bethel College in Newton, Kansas for five seasons, from 1960 until 1964, compiling a record of 17–26–2.

Friends
After Bethel, Buller became the head football coach at Friends University in Wichita, Kansas, serving from 1965 to 1968 season, during which time his program recorded a record of 19–15–2.

Southwestern
Buller was the 19th head football coach at Southwestern College in Winfield, Kansas, serving for three seasons, from 1969 to 1971.  His record at Southwestern was 15–11–1.

Buller resigned as head coach after the death of his wife in 1971.

Head coaching record

References

External links
 

1928 births
2018 deaths
Bethel Threshers football coaches
Friends Falcons football coaches
Southwestern Moundbuilders football coaches